Strike may refer to:

People
Strike (surname)

Physical confrontation or removal
Strike (attack), attack with an inanimate object or a part of the human body intended to cause harm
Airstrike, military strike by air forces on either a suspected or a confirmed enemy ground position
Bird strike, collision between an airborne animal and a man-made vehicle, especially aircraft
Military strike, limited attack on a specified target
Striking the colors, to haul down a flag to indicate surrender
Strikethrough, typographical presentation of words with a horizontal line through the center of them
Utility strike, during an excavation accidentally hitting or damaging buried pipes or wires belonging to a public utility or other such services
YouTube copyright strike, a copyright policing practice used by YouTube

Refusal to work or perform
Capital strike, refusal to invest in an economy
Hunger strike, participants fast as an act of political protest, or to provoke feelings of guilt in others
Rent strike, when a group of tenants en masse agrees to refuse to pay rent until a specific list of demands is met by the landlord
Sex strike, refusal to engage in sexual activity to challenge a societal dispute
Strike action, a work stoppage caused by the mass refusal of employees to perform work
Student strike, occurs when students enrolled at a teaching institution such as a school, college or university refuse to go to class

Science and technology
 Strike (unit), an obsolete unit of volume, typically equivalent to two bushels
Electric strike, access control device used for doors
Lightning strike, electrical discharges caused by lightning
Strike and dip, measure of the orientation of a geologic feature
"Striking", cutting parts of a plant for propagation
Striking clock, clock that sounds the hours on a bell or gong

Sport
Strike (bowling), a term used in bowling
Strike, a term used in Association football (soccer) to mean an accurate, driven shot kicked using the laces of the boot
"On strike", a term used to refer to the striker in cricket
Strike zone, a term used in baseball

Arts, entertainment, and media

Films
Strike (1912 film), a lost Australian film
Strike (1925 film), a silent film made in the Soviet Union by Sergei Eisenstein
Strike! (1998 film), a Canadian-American comedy film written and directed by Sarah Kernochan
Strike (2006 film), a Polish-language film directed by Volker Schlöndorff
Strike (2018 film), an animated film directed by Trevor Hardy

Music
Strike (band), British dance band formed in 1994
Strikes (album), third album by Southern rock band Blackfoot, released in 1979
"Support the Miners", a 1984 song by American drummer Keith LeBlanc

Television
Strike (TV series), a BBC series based on the Cormoran Strike detective book series
"The Strike" (Seinfeld), 166th episode of the NBC sitcom; it aired in December 1997
"The Strike", 1988 episode of The Comic Strip Presents

Video games
Strike (video game series), video games released during 1991–1997 by Electronic Arts
Strikes, cooperative multiplayer modes in the video game Destiny, similar to a military strike

Other uses in arts, entertainment, and media
Strike, the Japanese name for the Pokémon Scyther
S.T.R.I.K.E., fictional counter-terrorism and intelligence agency in the Marvel Comics universe
Strike Entertainment, film production company founded in 2002 by Marc Abraham and Thomas Bliss, associated with Universal Studios
Kamen Rider Strike, a Kamen Rider Dragon Knight character

Other uses
<strike>, the HTML tag
Strike price, fixed price at which the owner of an option can purchase, in the case of a call, or sell, in the case of a put, the underlying security or commodity

See also

Gold Strike (disambiguation)
Strike Force (disambiguation)
Striker (disambiguation)